Muhammed Emin Yavaş (born 5 September 2000) is a Turkish professional footballer who plays as a midfielder for TFF Third League club Ağrı 1970 on loan from Erzurumspor.

Professional career
Sert made his professional debut with Erzurumspor in a 4-1 Turkish Cup loss to Alanyaspor on 14 January 2021.

References

External links
 
 

2000 births
Sportspeople from Erzurum
Living people
Turkish footballers
Association football midfielders
Büyükşehir Belediye Erzurumspor footballers
İskenderun FK footballers
TFF First League players
TFF Third League players